Miracle: A Celebration of New Life is a book resulting from the collaboration of Anne Geddes with Canadian singer Céline Dion. The project is a combination of music and photos revolving around the themes of new life and babies.

The book was published in nine languages in 22 countries simultaneously, and remained in The New York Times bestseller list for six weeks. Miracle appeared on The Wall Street Journal nonfiction bestseller list, as well as the Publishers Weekly, Barnes & Noble, amazon.com Canada, and BookSense nonfiction hardcover bestseller lists and was #1 on the Wal-Mart.com bestseller list for two weeks. In Germany, Miracle debuted at #3 on the prestigious GEO magazine bestseller list for the month of December 2004, and remained within the top ten at #6 for the month of January 2005. It was #12 on the Livre Hebdo Fall 2004 illustrated books bestseller list in France. The same year the Miracle CD was released, where the inlay included just a few photographs from the same book.  The album was a Billboard magazine Top 5 international bestseller in December 2004.

Editions
 Hardcover Miracle: A Celebration of New Life (2004), Andrews McMeel Publishing; Book/CD/DVD edition (12 October 2004)  
 Paperback Miracle: A Celebration of New Life (2005) Warner Bros. Publications (March 2005)

References

External links
 Miracle book website

2004 non-fiction books
Photographic collections and books